North Evans is a hamlet in the town of Evans in Erie County, New York, United States. The North Evans Volunteer Fire Company is located on Versailles Road, as is the Hobuck Flats Fishing Access site. Hobuck Flats also includes a 1.1-mile hiking trail that passes Buttermilk Falls, a waterfall with two drops, of 15 and 54 feet respectively.

References

Hamlets in New York (state)
Hamlets in Erie County, New York